A crystal ball is a scrying or fortune telling orb object

Crystal Ball may also refer to:

 Crystal Ball (detector), a hermetic particle detector
 Crystal Ball function, a probability density function
 Crystal Ball (G.I. Joe), a fictional villain in the G.I. Joe universe, member of Cobra
 Sabato's Crystal Ball, a web site analyzing and predicting national political races
 "The Crystal Ball" (fairy tale), a German fairy tale collected by the Brothers Grimm
 The Crystal Ball (film), a 1943 film starring Ray Milland
 The Crystal Ball (painting), a 1902 painting by John William Waterhouse
 Crystal Ball, a "lifeline" in the Who Wants to Be a Millionaire? franchise

Music

Albums 
 Crystal Ball (box set), a 1998 box set by Prince
 Crystal Ball (EP), a 2019 EP by Purplebeck
 Crystal Ball (Styx album), a 1976 album by Styx
 Crystal Ball (unreleased album), album by Prince, recorded in 1986

Songs 
 "Crystal Ball" (Keane song), a 2006 song by Keane
 "Crystal Ball" (Styx song), the 1976 album's title track
 "Crystal Ball", a song by Pink from the album Funhouse
 "Crystal Ball", a song by Timeflies from the album After Hours

See also 
 Cristóbal (disambiguation), Spanish equivalent of "Christopher"
 "Crystal Baller", a 2003 song by Third Eye Blind
 Krystal Ball, news anchor and former MSNBC co-host